The 1979 Colgate Series Championships was a women's tennis tournament played on indoor carpet courts at the Capital Centre in Landover, Maryland in the United States that was the season-ending tournament of the 1979 Colgate Series. It was the third edition of the tournament and was held from January 2 through January 7, 1980. Second-seeded Martina Navratilova won the singles title and earned $75,000 first-prize money.

Finals

Singles
 Martina Navratilova defeated  Tracy Austin 6–2, 6–1
 It was Navratilova's 1st singles title of the year and the 35th of her career.

Doubles
 Billie Jean King /  Martina Navratilova defeated  Chris Evert /  Rosemary Casals 6–4, 6–3

Prize money 

Doubles prize money is per team.

See also
 1979 Avon Championships

References

External links
 International Tennis Federation (ITF) tournament edition details

Virginia Slims of Washington
1979 in sports in Maryland
Tennis in Maryland